Madan Tiwary (1923-2011) was an Indian politician. He was elected to the Lok Sabha, the lower house of the Parliament of India from Rajnandgaon, Madhya Pradesh as a member of the Janata Party.

References

External links
 Official biographical sketch on the Parliament of India website

1923 births
Janata Party politicians
Lok Sabha members from Madhya Pradesh
India MPs 1977–1979
People from Rajnandgaon
2013 deaths